Saint-Étienne-le-Molard is a commune in the Loire department in central France.

Geography
The river Lignon du Forez flows through the commune.

Population

See also
Communes of the Loire department

References

Communes of Loire (department)